The New York State Department of Family Assistance (DFA), also known as the Department of Family Services, is a department of the New York state government. Its regulations are compiled in title 18 of the New York Codes, Rules and Regulations.

It is composed of two autonomous offices:

 the New York State Office of Temporary and Disability Assistance (OTDA)
 the Office of Children and Family Services (OCFS)

Welfare Management System
The New York (state) Welfare Management System receives, maintains and processes information relating to persons who apply for benefits, or who are determined to be eligible for benefits under any program administered by the department.

Fair hearings 
Administrative reviews ("Fair Hearings") of decisions by a local social services agency are handled by the OTDA Office of Administrative Hearings.

A Rivera request, also known as an evidence packet request, is the document (labeled W-186A) used for requesting evidence relating to a NYC Human Resources Administration fair hearing pursuant to the stipulation and settlement in Rivera v. Bane.

History 

On August 20, 1997, Governor Pataki signed the Welfare Reform Act of 1997 that, in relevant part, renamed the Department of Social Services (DSS) as the Department of Family Assistance, and also divided the department into Office of Temporary and Disability Assistance (OTDA) and the State Office of Children and Family Services (OCFS). These two offices assumed many of DSS' functions.  Other functions of the former DSS were transferred to the Department of Labor and the Department of Health. In addition, as part of the reorganization of State government, OCFS assumed all of the functions of the Division for Youth (DFY). It was also formerly the Department of Social Welfare.

See also 
 New York City Human Resources Administration

References

External links 
 New York State Department of Family Services
 New York State Office of Temporary and Disability Assistance
 New York State Office of Children and Family Services
 Department of Social Services in the New York Codes, Rules and Regulations
 New York Office of Children and Family Services recipient profile on USAspending.gov

Family Assistance
Welfare in New York (state)